The 1968 United States presidential election in Oklahoma took place on November 5, 1968. All fifty states and the District of Columbia were part of the 1968 United States presidential election. Voters chose eight electors to the Electoral College, which selected the president and vice president of the United States.

Former Vice President Richard Nixon, the Republican nominee, won the state of Oklahoma with 449,697 votes and 47.68 percent of the vote, with Vice President Hubert Humphrey, the Democratic nominee, taking 301,658 votes and 31.99 percent of the vote, followed by American Independent George Wallace, who took 191,731 votes and 20.33 percent of the vote. Wallace’s performance is the second-best by a third-party candidate in the Sooner State, behind Ross Perot in 1992. The Wallace pluralities in Atoka and Pushmataha Counties in the southeast marked the only occasion that a third-party candidate has ever carried any Oklahoma county.

Results

Results by county

See also
 United States presidential elections in Oklahoma

Notes

References

1968 Oklahoma elections
1968
Oklahoma